Daniele Greco (born 1 March 1989) is an Italian athlete competing in the triple jump.

Biography
On 9 June 2012 at Potenza, he jumped 17.47 m, that is the 2nd best performance in Italy of all-time, after the national record of Fabrizio Donato with the measure of 17.73 m.
He won the National Championships in Brixen on 8 July 2012 with 17.67m (+3.4), defeating the European champion, Fabrizio Donato. In Goteborg 2013 he jumped is new personal best with the measure of 17.70 m and best year performance.

His best international result was the 4th place at the 2012 Summer Olympics and the gold medal at the 2013 European Indoor Championships.

Achievements

National titles
1 win in triple jump at the Italian Athletics Championships (2012)

See also
 Italian all-time lists - Triple jump

References

External links
 
 
 
 

1989 births
Living people
Italian male triple jumpers
People from Nardò
Athletes (track and field) at the 2012 Summer Olympics
Olympic athletes of Italy
Athletics competitors of Fiamme Oro
Italian Athletics Championships winners
Mediterranean Games gold medalists for Italy
Mediterranean Games bronze medalists for Italy
Athletes (track and field) at the 2009 Mediterranean Games
Athletes (track and field) at the 2013 Mediterranean Games
World Athletics Championships athletes for Italy
Mediterranean Games medalists in athletics
Sportspeople from the Province of Lecce
21st-century Italian people